Colum Kenny is a journalist, barrister and historian. He is Emeritus Professor at Dublin City University (DCU), in Dublin, Ireland.  He was formerly chair of the Masters in Journalism programme at DCU in the School of Communications 1982-2015.

Kenny was a member of the Broadcasting Authority of Ireland 2010-2015 and of the Broadcasting Commission of Ireland/IRTC 1998-2003. A former employee of RTE, he was a founding board member of the E.U. Media Desk in Ireland and is a council member of the Irish Legal History Society. He was a member of the Media Mergers Advisory Group that reported to the Minister for Enterprise, Trade and Employment in 2008. The author of many academic articles on cultural and media matters, he is also a member of the National Union of Journalists and a frequent contributor to media debates and a consultant on communications.

Awards
Kenny was awarded the DCU President's Award for Research in the Humanities and Social Sciences, 2004/5.

In 2018 he was awarded the Gold Medal of the Irish Legal History Society.

Colum Kenny's book, "Midnight in London: The Anglo-Irish Treaty Crisis 1921"
During the night of 5–6 December 1921, Irish delegates at Downing Street signed an agreement to end the War of Independence and create a new Irish state. This is the story of that fraught deal, and of the events and people behind it. The story is told from original sources and eyewitness accounts, and brings to life the Treaty that sparked a civil war but made modern Ireland. Irish negotiators were under great pressure in London. For nearly two months Arthur Griffith, Michael Collins and three others faced some of the most powerful men in the British Empire, including David Lloyd George and Winston Churchill. Griffith and Collins saw the Treaty as a stepping-stone to greater freedom. Both were dead within a year. Colum Kenny turns a spotlight on the key issues and problems they faced, examining why Éamon de Valera stayed away and what the delegates themselves achieved. Ireland was already partitioned when the talking started. The choice was whether or not to fight on for some kind of republic – or accept Britain’s offer of limited independence.

Did Michael Collins say that in signing the Anglo-Irish Treaty on the 6 December 1921 he was signing his own death warrant? Colum Kenny addressed this question in this book.

“A quotation has been attributed to Michael Collins, and very often repeated, to the effect that when he signed the agreement that night, he signed his own death warrant. This statement cannot be confirmed, as only one biographer, Rex Taylor, has claimed to have seen the letter in which it was reportedly made.”

Colum Kenny went on to say, “Collins did write to his friend Kitty Kiernan on 6 December to say that he had not got to bed until 5 o’clock that morning, adding, ‘I don’t know how things will go now but with God’s help we have brought peace to this land of ours - a peace which will end this old strife of ours forever’”

Published works
Books by Colum Kenny include:
  Midnight in London: The Anglo-Irish Treaty Crisis 1921, Eastwood Books, 2021. 
  The Enigma of Arthur Griffith, Merrion Press, 2020.
  An Irish-American Odyssey: The Remarkable Rise of the O'Shaughnessy Brothers, University of Missouri Press, 2014.
  Changes in Practice and Law: Essays to Mark Twenty-Five Years of the Irish Legal History Society,  ed. C. Kenny and D. Hogan.  Four Courts Press, Dublin, 2013.
  The Power of Silence: Silent Communication in Daily Life, Karnac, London, 2011.
  Moments that Changed Us [Ireland since 1973], Gill & Macmillan, 2005.
  Fearing Sellafield, Gill & Macmillan, 2003.
  Battle of the Books, 1972 Cultural Controversy at a Dublin Library, Four Courts Press, 2002.
  Molaise abbot of Leighlin and Hermit of Holy Island: The Life and Legacy of St Laisren in Ireland and Scotland, Morrigan Books, 1998.
  The Role of Believing Communities in Building Peace in Ireland, Glencree Centre for Peace and Reconciliation., 1998.
  Tristram Kennedy and the Revival of Irish Legal Training, 1835-1885, Irish Academic Press, 1996.
  Kilmainham: The History of a Settlement Older than Dublin, Four Courts Press, 1995.
  Standing on Bray Head: Hoping it Might Be So, Kestral Books, 1995.
  King's Inns and the Kingdom of Ireland: the Irish 'Inn of Court' 1541-1800, Irish Academic Press, 1992.

References

External links
 Home Page
 Colum Kenny when formerly a columnist at the Sunday Independent

Year of birth missing (living people)
Living people
Irish columnists
Academics of Dublin City University
Sunday Independent (Ireland) people